Basil Fawlty is the main character of the 1970s British sitcom Fawlty Towers, played by John Cleese. The proprietor of the hotel Fawlty Towers, he is a cynical and misanthropic snob, desperate to belong to a higher social class. His attempts to run the hotel often end in farce. Possessing a dry, sarcastic wit, Basil has become an iconic British comedy character who remains widely known to the public despite only 12 half-hour episodes ever having been made. Cleese would receive the 1980 British Academy Television Award for Best Entertainment Performance. In a 2001 poll conducted by Channel 4, Basil was ranked second on their list of the 100 Greatest TV Characters.

Known for his quotable rants, the character was inspired by Donald Sinclair, an eccentric, inhospitable hotel owner whom Cleese had encountered when he stayed at his hotel (Gleneagles Hotel in Torquay, England) along with the rest of Monty Python in May 1970.

Personality
Basil, who runs the titular hotel in Torquay, is a misanthropic, pessimistic snob, whose main aspiration is to become a member of more "respectable" social circles. He sees the successful running of the hotel as a means of achieving this dream, yet his job frequently requires him to be pleasant to people he despises – something he severely struggles with, referring with contempt to the majority of his guests as "plebs" and "riff-raff". His much more customer-friendly wife Sybil often has to deal with the fallout of Basil's bad treatment of the guests, to varying success. In the episode "Communication Problems," Manuel said Basil is from Swanage, although Manuel is prone to making mistakes.

Basil has staunch right-wing and traditionalist views about most things, for example in "The Wedding Party", he shows open disgust towards a young unmarried couple having an active sex life.  In "The Germans" he appears to blame the failure of the hotel's fire extinguisher on "bloody Wilson", referencing the-then Labour prime minister, Harold Wilson. He is also frequently furious about industrial action – in "A Touch of Class", he launches into a tirade against dustmen and postmen going on strike, and in "The Kipper and the Corpse" he is so enraged by news of a car strike that he fails to notice that one of his guests is dead.

He is desperate to avoid his wife's wrath, and his plans often conflict with hers, but he mostly fails to stand up to her. She is often verbally abusive towards him (describing him as "an ageing, brilliantined stick insect") and though he is much taller than Sybil, he often finds himself on the receiving end of her temper, expressed verbally and physically. Basil does occasionally manage to gain the upper hand. In "The Kipper and the Corpse", Sybil refuses to help Basil dispose of the body of recently deceased guest Mr. Leeman. Basil gets his revenge towards the end of the episode, when he asks a number of disgruntled guests to direct their complaints towards Sybil. In "The Psychiatrist", he has a row with Sybil during which he calls his wife a "rancorous, coiffured old sow". He often addresses her (in a faux-romantic way) with insults such as "my little nest of vipers".

Basil takes many of his frustrations out on the hapless waiter Manuel, physically abusing and bullying him in a variety of ways. The relationship between Basil Fawlty and Manuel has been the subject of academic discourse. On occasions he also assaults others, such as choking a guest in "The Hotel Inspectors", kneeing Major Gowen in "Basil the Rat", "accidentally" elbowing a young boy in the head in "Gourmet Night" and, in the same episode, famously beating his "vicious bastard" of a car with a tree branch when it breaks down.

Another eccentricity affecting Basil is that of occasionally swapping words around in a sentence while propounding a falsehood, for instance in "The Anniversary" when he announces to the party guests that it's "perfectly Sybil! Simple's not well.  She's lost her throat and her voice hurts", and – less obviously – reassuring himself as much as his wife in "The Wedding Party" that the sound of knocking on his bedroom door was "probably some key who forgot the guest for their door".  He also has difficulty disconnecting his thought-process from unrelated events, as in "The Wedding Party", when he is looking through Polly's sketchbook of life-drawing pictures and answers the telephone with, "Hello, Fawlty Titties?" or in "The Psychiatrist", where, after inadvertently staining a female guest with paint, he realises that Sybil has noticed, and in panic puts his hands on the guest's breasts as a means of stopping her from seeing it.

Basil is known to have served in the British Army during the Korean War, possibly as part of his National Service. He claims: "I fought in the Korean War, you know, I killed four men" to which his wife jokingly replies, "He was in the Catering Corps; he used to poison them". He often wears military ties, and sports a military-type moustache. He also claims to have sustained a shrapnel injury to his leg in the Korean War, which has a tendency to flare up at convenient moments – usually when Sybil asks him an awkward question. (John Cleese was only 14 years old when the Korean War ended, suggesting that Basil is several years older than he.) Basil is often seen wearing regimental ties, most frequently that of the East Lancashire Regiment, and sometimes that of the Gordon Highlanders. He is also seen wearing a Winchester College tie (in "The Kipper and the Corpse"), and a Balliol College, Oxford tie (in "The Germans"). It is likely that these regimental and old boy ties were all worn dishonestly; an example of Basil's pretentiousness.

John Cleese himself described Basil as being a man who could run a top-notch hotel if he didn't have all the guests getting in the way.  He has also made the point that on account of Basil's inner need to conflict with his wife's wishes, "Basil couldn't be Basil if he didn't have Sybil".

His desire to elevate his class status is exemplified in the unusual care and respect he affords upper class guests, such as Lord Melbury (who turned out to be an impostor), Mrs Peignoir (a wealthy French antique dealer) and Major Gowen, an elderly ex-soldier and recurring character – although Basil is sometimes scathing towards him, frequently alluding to his senility and his frequenting of the hotel bar ("drunken old sod").  He has particular respect for doctors, having once aspired to be one himself, and shows a reverential attitude to Dr. Abbott in "The Psychiatrist" (until he learns that Dr. Abbott is a psychiatrist), and Dr. Price in "The Kipper and the Corpse" (until Dr. Price begins to ask awkward questions about the death of Mr. Leeman, and inconveniently requests sausages for breakfast).

Basil is constantly spiteful and abusive to guests, and liable to pick up a tail-end of a situation (often panicking when things go wrong) and turn it into a farcical misunderstanding. Basil is known for his tight-fisted attitude to the hotel's expenses, employing completely incompetent builder O'Reilly in "The Builders" simply because he was cheap. Notoriously, he also becomes indignant whenever a guest makes a request, even if the request is quite reasonable. In "The Kipper and the Corpse", he is offended when a sickly guest politely asked for breakfast in bed, and Basil responds by sarcastically asking him which type of wood he would like his breakfast tray made out of.

Basil has been married to Sybil since 17 April 1964, although Sybil once sarcastically stated that they have been married since 1485. They very rarely show any signs of affection towards one another (in "The Wedding Party" they are shown to sleep in separate beds); in "A Touch of Class", Basil kisses Sybil but she tells him not to, and in "Gourmet Night" Sybil shows affection towards Basil while she is drunk, to which he responds telling her to "drink another vat of wine". "The Anniversary" is one of the few episodes in which Basil tries to be nice to Sybil, who misreads the situation and believes he has forgotten their anniversary.

Reprisals
John Cleese portrayed Basil in a 1980 special of the British rock band, Queen. Basil is seen at a bar and is asked what he thinks of Queen, to which he shows disgust and calls the music "rock rubbish." He asks, "What do you need that for when you got Beethoven?" 

John Cleese reprised the role of Basil in the song "Don't Mention the World Cup", an allusion to "don't mention the war" from the Fawlty Towers episode "The Germans", for the 2006 FIFA World Cup, which was played in Germany.

Cleese appeared as Basil in a 2016 TV advertisement for Specsavers during which, in a reference to the Fawlty Towers episode "Gourmet Night" where the character thrashes his car with a branch, Basil accidentally attacks an adjacent police car, mistaking it for his own.

In February 2023 a revival to Fawlty Towers was announced with Cleese reprising the role as an older Basil still running the hotel whilst trying to fit into the modern world.

Origins
Fawlty Towers was inspired by the Monty Python team's stay in the Gleneagles Hotel in Torquay. Cleese and Booth stayed on at the hotel after filming for the Python show had finished. The owner, Mr Donald Sinclair, was very rude, throwing a bus timetable at a guest who asked when the next bus to town would arrive and placing Eric Idle's suitcase behind a wall in the garden in case it contained a bomb (actually it contained a ticking alarm clock). He also criticised the American-born Terry Gilliam's table manners for being too American (he had the fork in what Sinclair considered to be the wrong hand while eating). Cleese used the name "Donald Sinclair" for his character in the 2001 film Rat Race. In the episode "The Builders", Fawlty refers to a local hotel or restaurant called "Gleneagles" while talking to Miss Gatsby and Miss Tibbs. Cleese once lived in London's Basil Street.

Cultural references
In the British fantasy series Redwall, an extremely sarcastic and imprudent anthropomorphic hare, "Basil Stag Hare", makes an appearance. Author Brian Jacques claims to have based his name and character on Basil Fawlty.

In the 2004 film Shrek 2, John Cleese's character of King Harold references the character by using Fawlty's excuse of "war wound shrapnel" with "Just the old Crusade wound playing up a bit".

In the 2016 movie Deadpool, one of the scenes sees the titular character (played by Ryan Reynolds) asking Ajax (played by Ed Skrein) what his name is, he asks many names and one of them is Basil Fawlty.

In the 2016 expansion Blood and Wine for the video game The Witcher 3: Wild Hunt, there is a character named Barnabas-Basil Foulty who acts as Geralt's majordomo.

In the comedy-drama anthology series The White Lotus, resort manager Armand (played by Murray Bartlett) bears a strong physical resemblance to Basil Fawlty. Like Basil he frequently displays erratic and sarcastic behaviour and is highly antagonistic towards certain guests.

Adaptations
When Fawlty Towers was remade for American television, the character of Basil Fawlty was also remade. In the 1978 remake Snavely, Basil's character is recreated as loud-mouthed Henry Snavely. In Amanda's, the character was recreated somewhat as the rude Amanda Cartwright, and in Payne, the character appeared as meddlesome Royal Payne.

In Hotel de Botel (the Dutch adaptation of Fawlty Towers), Basil was renamed to Koos Overwater and was played by Dutch comedian and actor Andre van Duin.

References

Fawlty Towers characters
Fictional English people
Fictional hoteliers
Fictional characters based on real people
Fictional Korean War veterans
Fictional business executives
Television characters introduced in 1975
Male characters in television